Adrienne Krebitz (born 17 January 1947) is an Austrian fencer. She competed in the women's team foil event at the 1972 Summer Olympics.

References 

1947 births
Living people
Austrian female foil fencers
Olympic fencers of Austria
Fencers at the 1972 Summer Olympics